Christos Andreoudis (born 10 May 1959) is a retired Greek football midfielder.

References

1959 births
Living people
Greek footballers
Athlitiki Enosi Larissa F.C. players
Iraklis Thessaloniki F.C. players
Diagoras F.C. players
Niki Volos F.C. players
Super League Greece players
Association football midfielders
Footballers from Larissa